The St. Clair Group Trophy is awarded annually by the Western Hockey League to its top public relations and marketing personnel.  It has been handed out since 1989–90.

List of winners

References

Western Hockey League trophies and awards